WJOX may refer to:

WJOX (AM), a radio station (690 AM) in Birmingham, Alabama, United States
WJOX-FM, a radio station (94.5 FM) in Birmingham, Alabama, United States
WJQX, a radio station (100.5 FM) in Helena, Alabama, United States known as WJOX from 2006 to 2008
WJXQ, a radio station (106.1 FM) licensed to Charlotte, Michigan known as WJOX from 1976 to March 1981